The 1981 Victorian Football League (VFL) draft was the first annual national draft held by the VFL, the leading Australian rules football league.

Held on 8 October 1981, all twelve VFL clubs participated in the draft, each having two picks, with the team finishing last in the 1981 VFL season having first choice, followed by the other eleven clubs in reverse finishing position order. Wooden spooners  named Perth wingman Alan Johnson as the first pick of the draft.

References

Australian Football League draft
VFL Draft, 1981
VFL Draft